TCE may refer to:

Education
Tamil Nadu College of Engineering, a private engineering college in Karumathampatti, Coimbatore, Tamil Nadu, India
Tasmanian Certificate of Education, the main credential awarded to students who successfully complete senior high school studies in Tasmania, Australia
Thiagarajar College of Engineering, an autonomous institution in Madurai, Tamil Nadu, India
Tilburg Center of Entrepreneurship, academic institution in the Netherlands

Measurement
Temperature Coefficient of Expansion, also referred to as Coefficient of thermal expansion, a measure of the change in size of an object as its temperature changes
Tail conditional expectation, a risk measure associated with the more general value at risk
Time charter equivalent, a measurement to compare shipping companies' performance
Tonne of coal equivalent (tce), is a unit of energy defined as the amount of energy released by burning one tonne of coal.

Companies and organizations
Tata Consulting Engineers (TCE) Limited, an engineering consulting firm based in India
Texas Campaign for the Environment a non-profit organization on health and environmental issues in Texas, United States

Performing arts
 Théâtre des Champs-Élysées, a renowned entertainment venue in Paris

Business, finance, and economics
Tax Counseling for the Elderly, one of the United States Internal Revenue Service#Programs that offers free tax help to citizens of age 60 or older
Tangible common equity, the subset of shareholders' equity of a company that is not preferred equity and not intangible assets
Transaction cost economics, the social science that analyzes the costs incurred in making an economic exchange

Science and technology
 The Chemical Engineer, a journal which was titled TCE from 2002 to 2015
 Trichloroethylene, an industrial solvent, commonly found as a groundwater contaminant
 Translation Control Entry, the IOMMU hardware in some IBM server computers
 Technology-critical element in chemistry

Other uses
 Traditional cultural expressions, along with traditional knowledge, a form of indigenous knowledge
Treaty establishing a Constitution for Europe, a proposed constitutional treaty of the European Union
Tung Chung East station, Hong Kong (MTR station code)
Tasha's Cauldron of Everything, an accessory for the 5th edition Dungeons & Dragons roleplaying game